Lawrence B. "Larry" Salander (born 1949) is a former New York City art dealer and artist. His company, the Salander-O'Reilly Galleries, was cited by the Robb Report in 2003 as the best gallery in the world. By late 2007, Salander had been sued by numerous customers and business partners who claimed that Salander and his company had defrauded them.

In November 2007, Salander filed for personal bankruptcy, listing John McEnroe among his creditors. At the time, several artists represented by Salander-O'Reilly also claimed to be owed money. As a result of his bankruptcy, Salander and his wife were ordered to relinquish control of their finances to a trustee.

In March 2009, Salander was charged with 13 counts of first-degree grand larceny, 10 counts of second-degree grand larceny, and other charges. After posting bail of one million dollars, Salander worked in the Phoenix Art LLC Gallery in Millbrook, New York. The Phoenix Gallery exhibited works of the Hudson River Valley, including canvases by well known artist Ralph Della-Volpe, photographer  Annemiek do Gersten, and acclaimed Cuban Outsider artist Corso de Palenzuela.

In March 2010  Salander pleaded guilty to 29 felony counts of grand larceny and was sentenced to six to eighteen years in prison. He admitted to selling dozens of pieces that he was supposed to hold without permission. In addition the New York Times reported that Salander had recently been hospitalized with a stroke.

In August 2010, Salander was sentenced to 6 to 18 years in prison for his crimes.

He is currently imprisoned at Rikers Island in New York City.

References 

American art dealers
Living people
1949 births
American male criminals
21st-century criminals
American prisoners and detainees
American people convicted of fraud